Virrankoski is a surname. Notable people with the surname include:

Kyösti Virrankoski (born 1944), Finnish politician
Pentti Virrankoski (born 1929), Finnish historian